Thibault Desseignet (born September 16, 1998) is a French professional basketball player for Nantes of LNB Pro B.

He joined JL Bourg in 2015. Desseignet injured his shoulder in December 2017. In April 2018 he sprained his ankle and missed some time.

References 

1998 births
Living people
French men's basketball players
JL Bourg-en-Bresse players
Point guards
Sportspeople from Roanne